Operation HOPE, Inc., is an American non-profit organization providing financial literacy empowerment and economic education to youth and adults. The mission of this organization is providing everybody with enterprise work and the programs carried out by Operation HOPE, Inc. Andrew Young is the global spokesman of the organization and John Hope Bryant is the chairman.

Operation HOPE serves 4,000 inner city schools, 500 low-wealth communities, and conducts programs in South Africa, Saudi Arabia, Morocco, and the United Arab Emirates.  Bryant has procured $2 billion in private investments to support the organization's mission.

History 
Operation HOPE, Inc., was founded by John Hope Bryant on May 5, 1992, immediately following the 1992 Rodney King riots in Los Angeles, California.

On October 8, 2019, Operation HOPE reported it is reissuing the 2017 audited financial statements and is also reorganizing to improve its operations and finances.

Programs and services

Project 5117
Project 5117's aim is to help the economically weaker section of the society. Project 5117 has an alliance with the U.S. Consumer Financial Protection Bureau (CFPB). Project 5117 stands for 5 million youth empowered, out of them turning 1 million into future entrepreneurs, opening 1,000 empowerment centers and attaining 700 credit score communities.

Youth Empowerment Group
Youth Empowerment Group, also called Banking on Our Future, focuses on improving the dignity and economic self-sufficiency of people in under-served communities by providing them with financial literacy.

HOPE Coalition America
HOPE Coalition America is a financial emergency preparedness and recovery service. It provides financial and economic assistance to those affected by natural disasters. It also provides pre-disaster preparedness planning.

HOPE Corps
HOPE Corps comprises Operation HOPE's network of volunteers. The volunteers promote financial self-sufficiency and empowerment in the areas where this kind of knowledge is most helpful.

Office of Small Business & Entrepreneurship
This wing of Operation HOPE promotes youth entrepreneurship by creating communities of economic opportunities. The program aims to increasing the number of young Americans involved in small business and entrepreneurship.

References 

Non-profit organizations based in Los Angeles
Organizations established in 1992
Personal finance education